Azizi may refer to:

Geography 
 Azizi-ye Olya, Kohgiluyeh and Boyer-Ahmad Province, Iran
 Azizi-ye Sofla, Kohgiluyeh and Boyer-Ahmad Province, Iran
 Azizi-ye Vosta, Kohgiluyeh and Boyer-Ahmad Province, Iran

People
 a sub-tribe of the Kheshgi Pashtun tribe

Given name
 Azizi Johari, American model and actress
 Azizi Matt Rose, Malaysian footballer
 Sohail Ahmed, Pakistani comedian sometimes known as Azizi

Surname
 Alireza Azizi, Iranian footballer
 Ebrahim Azizi, Iranian politician
 Farida Azizi, Afghan women's rights activist
 Khodadad Azizi, Iranian footballer
 Masoud Azizi, Afghan athlete
 Mohammad Azizi, Iranian footballer
 Mohammad Iqbal Azizi, Afghan governor
 Mostafa Azizi, Iranian film producer
 Rostam Azizi, Tanzanian politician
 Saifuddin Azizi, Chinese politician
 Hadi Azizi, Iranian businessman
 Yusef Azizi Bani-Torof (born 1951), Iranian journalist and activist

Other uses
 Azizi Bank, an Afghani bank
 Fatawa Azizi, a fatwa book by 18th century Islamic scholar Shah Abdul Aziz